Menkov is a Russian masculine surname, its feminine counterpart is Menkova. It may refer to
Aksana Miankova (Oksana Menkova, born 1982), Belarusian hammer thrower
Aleksandr Menkov (born 1990), Russian long jumper
Vadim Menkov (born 1987), Uzbek sprint canoer

Russian-language surnames